In matroid theory, a field within mathematics, a gammoid is a certain kind of matroid, describing sets of vertices that can be reached by vertex-disjoint paths in a directed graph.

Definition
Let  be a directed graph,  be a set of starting vertices, and  be a set of destination vertices (not necessarily disjoint from ). The gammoid  derived from this data has  as its set of elements.

Thus, a gammoid is a restriction of a strict gammoid, to a subset of its elements.

Example
The special structure of this graph shows that the uniform matroid is a transversal matroid as well as being a gammoid.

Alternatively, the same uniform matroid  may be represented as a gammoid on a smaller graph, with only  vertices, by choosing a subset  of  vertices and connecting each of the chosen vertices to every other vertex in the graph. Again, a subset of the vertices of the graph can be endpoints of disjoint paths if and only if it has  or fewer vertices, because otherwise there are not enough vertices that can be starts of paths. In this graph, every vertex corresponds to an element of the matroid, showing that the uniform matroid is a strict gammoid.

Menger's theorem and gammoid rank

Relation to transversal matroids

Less trivially, the strict gammoids are exactly the dual matroids of the transversal matroids. Conversely every basis of the transversal matroid, consisting of a representative  for each , gives rise to a complementary basis of the strict gammoid, consisting of the endpoints of the paths formed by the set of edges . This result is due to Ingleton and Piff.

To see, conversely, that every transversal matroid is dual to a strict gammoid, find a subfamily of the sets defining the matroid such that the subfamily has a system of distinct representatives and defines the same matroid. Form a graph that has the union of the sets as its vertices and that has an edge to the representative element of each set from the other members of the same set. Then the sets  formed as above for each representative element  are exactly the sets defining the original transversal matroid, so the strict gammoid formed by this graph and by the set of representative elements is dual to the given transversal matroid.

As an easy consequence of the Ingleton-Piff Theorem, every gammoid is a contraction of a transversal matroid. The gammoids are the smallest class of matroids that includes the transversal matroids and is closed under duality and taking minors.

Representability
It is not true that every gammoid is regular, i.e., representable over every field. However, every gammoid may be represented over almost every finite field. More specifically, a gammoid with element set  may be represented over every field that has at least  elements.

References

Matroid theory
Graph connectivity